Trafficking protein particle complex 11 is a protein that in humans is encoded by the TRAPPC11 gene.

Function

The protein encoded by this gene is a subunit of the TRAPP (transport protein particle) tethering complex, which functions in intracellular vesicle trafficking. This subunit is involved in early stage endoplasmic reticulum-to-Golgi vesicle transport. Alternative splicing of this gene results in multiple transcript variants. [provided by RefSeq, Jan 2013].

References

Further reading